Kalanchoe bouvetii is a plant endemic to Madagascar. It was discovered by Raymond Hamet.

References

bouvetii
Endemic flora of Madagascar
Plants described in 1914
Taxa named by Joseph Marie Henry Alfred Perrier de la Bâthie